The Satellite A series was Toshiba Information Systems's premium consumer line of Satellite laptops. Introduced with the A10 and A20 models in 2003, the A series originally targeted high school and college students and workers of small offices and home offices, before becoming a premium line by the late 2000s.

Prices of models in the series in 2003 ranged from roughly US$800 to US$1200; it sold especially well in among the SOHO segment. Some laptops in the series constituted desktop replacements because of their heft: the A45 was lauded by PC Magazine and PC World for its battery life and multimedia capabilities, especially the quality of its speakers, but PC Magazine wrote that its 7.6-lb weight made the laptop good only "for occasional mobile use". Other models, such as the A105, were fairly light for the time, at 6 lb, though battery life was observed to have suffered as a consequence, according to PC Magazine. The magazine wrote that the A105 and A75 were particularly adept at home video capture and editing, while the A65 was rated particularly poorly.

The last entry in the series, the A665, had submodels capable of stereoscopic graphics rendering with its special LCD that was compatible with the Nvidia 3D Vision active shutter glasses.

The A series was superseded by the P series in 2011.

Models

References

Satellite A series